Bardymsky District is an administrative district (raion) of Perm Krai, Russia; one of the thirty-three in the krai. Municipally, it is incorporated as Bardymsky Municipal District. It is located in the south of the krai, in the valley of the Tulva River, and borders with Osinsky District in the north, Kungursky District in the northeast, Uinsky District in the east, Chernushinsky District in the southeast, Kuyedinsky District in the southwest, and with Yelovsky District in the west. Its administrative center is the rural locality (a selo) of Barda. Population:  The population of Barda accounts for 34.6% of the district's total population.

Geography
About one half of district's territory is covered by forests. Climate is temperate continental.

History
The district was first established on November 4, 1926. In October 1938, it became a part of Perm Oblast. It was abolished between February 1, 1963 and January 12, 1965.

Demographics
The population of the district is wholly rural. The most numerous ethnic groups, according to the 2002 Census, include Bashkirs at 60%, Tatars at 32.3%, and Russians at 7.2%.

Economy
District's economy is based on agriculture. Logging and extraction of oil are also developed. Agricultural lands account for about 40% of the district's total territory. Annually, 15,500 tons of milk, 3,600 tons of meat, 58,300 tons of crops, and 6,800 tons of potatoes are produced in the district. There are many food processing plants in the district, as well as some oil industry and construction companies.

Natural resources
There are deposits of oil in the district.

Notable residents 

Nikolay Karakulov (1918–1988), Soviet sprinter 
Sharifzyan Kazanbaev (1916–1944), Tatar Red Army sergeant major, Hero of the Soviet Union

References

Notes

Sources

Districts of Perm Krai